Vurës (Vureas, Vures) is an Oceanic language spoken in the southern area of Vanua Lava Island, in the Banks Islands of northern Vanuatu, by about 2000 speakers.

Vurës was described by linguist Catriona Malau, in the form of a grammar and a dictionary.

Name
The name Vurës  is named after the bay located in southwestern Vanua Lava in the language itself. In Mota, the bay is referred to as Vureas . These come from a reconstructed Proto-Torres-Banks form *βureas(i,u).

Dialectology
Vurës shows enough similarities with the neighbouring language Mwesen that the two have sometimes been considered dialects of a single language, sometimes called Mosina (after the name of Mwesen village in the language Mota). And indeed, a 2018 glottometric study has calculated that Vurës and Mwesen share 85% of their historical innovations, revealing a long history of shared development between these two lects.

However, studies have shown that Mwesen and Vurës have various dissimilarities, e.g. in their vowel systems, in their noun articles, in their pronoun paradigms — enough to be considered clearly distinct.

Phonology

Consonants 

  is also heard as a tap  in free variation.
 A glottal stop  only rarely occurs in some words.
  is heard as  before a voiceless stop.
  is heard as  when preceding another consonant.
 Stop sounds  are aspirated  before vowels.

Vowels 
Vurës has 9 phonemic vowels. These are all short monophthongs :

  is only a marginal sound that occurs in a small amount of words, mostly borrowings.
 The vowel inventory also includes a diphthong  .

References

Citations

Bibliography

 

 .

 .

External links

 Vurës—English dictionary, by Catriona Malau.
 Audio recordings in the Vurës language, in open access, by A. François (Pangloss Collection, CNRS).

Banks–Torres languages
Languages of Vanuatu